The 2003/04 football season saw Plymouth Argyle regain a place in the second tier of English football for the first time in twelve seasons, Along the way to capturing the Division Two championship they accumulated 90 league points, 21 clean sheets and a club record of seven straight clean sheets whilst also losing arguably the most successful manager in recent history in Paul Sturrock to Southampton F.C.

Players

First-team squad
Squad at end of season

Left club during season

Pre-season

Matches

Last updated: 5 November 2014Source:Greens on Screen

Football League Division Two

Matches

Last updated: 8 November 2014Source:Soccerbase

FA Cup

Matches

Last updated: 9 November 2014Source:Soccerbase

League Cup

Matches

Last updated: 9 November 2014Source:Soccerbase

Football League Trophy

Matches

Last updated: 9 November 2014Source:Soccerbase

Notable events
22 October 2003: Plymouth Argyle defeat Sheffield Wednesday 3–1 at Hillsborough to go top of Division Two.
24 October 2003: Argyle receive performance of the week award for their 5–1 victory over Port Vale.
1 November 2003: Paul Sturrock named Division Two Manager of the Month for October.
6 November 2003: David Friio announced as Division Two player of the month for October.
23 December 2003: Paul Sturrock signs a four and a half year contract with Argyle.
26 December 2003: Paul Wotton scores Argyle's 5000th League goal in a 2–0 victory over AFC Bournemouth. Plymouth Argyle become the first League side to score 50 goals in that season.
2 January 2004: Paul Sturrock named Division Two Manager of the Month for December.
3 January 2004: David Friio scores the first hat-trick for Argyle since Paul McGregor in March 2000.
6 January 2004: Paul Sturrock named as winner of the second quarter of the League managers Association's Tissot Managers' Performance League.
17 January 2004: Billy Rafferty and Paul Mariner make a guest appearance at Home Park. Argyle played Rushden & Diamonds on that day and won 3–0.
5 February 2004: Graham Coughlan announced as Division Two player of the month for January.
19 February 2004: The club's first retail outlet in Plymouth city centre opens. The club also unveils next season's away kit – the first to be voted for by fans.
2 March 2004: Plymouth Argyle complete the second "double" over Sheffield Wednesday in their history, by beating them for a second time in the season. Argyle won the match 2–0.
3 March 2004: Paul Sturrock agrees personal terms to take over as Southampton manager.
4 March 2004: Sturrock is unveiled by Southampton as their new manager at a press conference.
17 March 2004: The club announces that next year's away kit will be white, instead of tangerine, due to supporter demands.
27 March 2004: One hundred former Argyle players returned to Home Park for the game against Wrexham.
31 March 2004: Tony Capaldi becomes the first Plymouth Argyle player to win a cap for a home nation since Dave Phillips (Wales) in 1984. Capaldi plays for Northern Ireland.
10 April 2004: It becomes mathematically certain that Plymouth Argyle will achieve promotion or a play-off place, following a 2–1 win over Wycombe Wanderers.
20 April 2004: Bobby Williamson is unveiled as the permanent successor to Paul Sturrock, following much speculation about the managerial vacancy.
24 April 2004: A 2–0 win over Queens Park Rangers hands Argyle both promotion and the Division Two title.
6 May 2004: Graham Coughlan is named as the Division Two player of the season.
8 May 2004: Mickey Evans is announced as the club's player of the season and Luke McCormick as the most promising player as decided by fans. Plymouth Argyle are presented with the Division Two trophy after their 2–0 win over Colchester United
17 May 2004: Paul Sturrock is named as the Division Two manager of the season for his efforts at Argyle.
21 May 2004: The club holds its centenary ball to celebrate the previous season. The Plymouth Argyle team of the century, decided by supporters, is announced.

Transfers

Out

References

Plymouth Argyle F.C. seasons
Plymouth Argyle